Evdokija and Jevdokija (Јевдокија) are Serbian and Macedonian variants of Greek name Eudokia (Ευδοκία), a feminine given name. It may refer to:

Teodora-Evdokija (1330–after 1381), daughter of Stefan Dečanski, wife of Dejan
Jevdokija Balšić (fl. 1411), daughter of Đurađ I Balšić, wife of Esau de' Buondelmonti
Eudokia Angelina or Evdokija Anđel (fl. 1186–1211), daughter of Alexios III Angelos, wife of Stefan the First-Crowned

Evdokija Foteva - Vera (1926 - 2011), a Macedonian communist from Aegean Macedonia.

See also
Eudoxia (name) - covers all people, places, ships etc. named either Eudokia or derived variants of the name, including Evdokija
Evdokiya, Bulgarian variant

Serbian feminine given names